Ali Shams al-Din ibn Ibrahim was the thirteenth Tayyibi Isma'ili Dāʿī al-Muṭlaq in Yemen, from 1329 to his death in 1345.

Family
Syedna Ali Shamsuddin was the son of 11th Dai Syedna Ibrahim ibn al-Husayn (Ibn al-Walid).

Life
During the lifetime of his father, Syedna Ali had acquired Hisne Kawkaban for a huge sum of money and had accommodated his wife over here. During his tenure, the Ashraaf from the sons of Tajuddin bin Yahya bin Hamza marched to the fortress of Dhu Marmar and took control of it. Syedna Ali mobilized a large army and sent it to confront the invader. 

Allied with some of the Banu Hamdan tribe, he fought against the Zaydi imams. In 1332, his forces seized the fortress of Dhu Marmar.

Lineage
His son Abdallah became the 16th Dāʿī al-Muṭlaq in 1378.

Gallery

References

Sources
 

Tayyibi da'is
1345 deaths
Year of birth unknown
Banu al-Walid al-Anf
Burials in Yemen
14th century in Yemen
14th-century Arabs
14th-century Ismailis
14th-century Islamic religious leaders